Monroe Township is one of the nineteen townships of Guernsey County, Ohio, United States. As of the 2010 census the population was 747, up from 598 at the 2000 census.

Geography
Located in the northern part of the county, it borders the following townships:
Washington Township, Tuscarawas County - north
Perry Township, Tuscarawas County - northeast
Washington Township - east
Madison Township - southeast corner
Jefferson Township - south
Liberty Township - southwest
Wheeling Township - west
Oxford Township, Tuscarawas County - northwest corner

No municipalities are located in Monroe Township, although the unincorporated community of Birmingham lies in the township's southeast.

Name and history
Monroe Township was established in 1818. It is one of twenty-two Monroe Townships statewide.

Government
The township is governed by a three-member board of trustees, who are elected in November of odd-numbered years to a four-year term beginning on the following January 1. Two are elected in the year after the presidential election and one is elected in the year before it. There is also an elected township fiscal officer, who serves a four-year term beginning on April 1 of the year after the election, which is held in November of the year before the presidential election. Vacancies in the fiscal officership or on the board of trustees are filled by the remaining trustees.

References

External links
County website

Townships in Guernsey County, Ohio
Townships in Ohio